Anna Danilina and Valeriya Strakhova were the defending champions but Strakhova chose not to participate. Danilina partnered alongside Arianne Hartono and successfully defend her title, defeating Ankita Raina and Rosalie van der Hoek in the final, 6–7(4–7), 6–4, [10–6].

Seeds

Draw

Draw

References

External Links
Main Draw

Reinert Open - Doubles